Thomas Gurney may refer to:

 Thomas Gurney, alleged murderer of Edward II
 Thomas Gurney (shorthand writer) (1705–1770), English shorthand-writer
 Thomas Gurney (MP) for Dartmouth (UK Parliament constituency)